The North American Meat Institute (NAMI) is a non-profit, industry trade association formed in 2015 from the merger of the American Meat Institute (AMI) and the North American Meat Association (NAMA). It is headquartered in metropolitan Washington, DC.

History

The North American Meat Institute was formed with the merger of the American Meat Institute and North American Meat Association in 2015. The origins of the association date back to the passage of the Federal Meat Inspection Act in 1906, one of the first U.S. laws to set federal food processing standards. The American Meat Packers Association was founded in Chicago shortly thereafter to assist meat packers in complying with the new law. Its name was changed to the American Meat Institute in 1940.  In 1979, AMI moved from Chicago to Washington, DC to be closer to the federal government while regulatory and legislative affairs dominated the institute's agenda. 

NAMA formed in 2012 from the merger of the National Meat Association (NMA) and the North American Meat Processors (NAMP). NAMA was headquartered in Oakland, California.  NMA was formed by the merger of Pacific Coast Meat Association, itself formed in 1948, and Western States Meat Packers Association which had launched in 1946 in San Francisco, California.  NMA was once known as Western States Meat Association, but had since grown to national prominence with approximately 500 member companies.   It had a biennial trade show called MEATXPO.

COVID-19 pandemic 

During the coronavirus pandemic, NAMI wrote a draft of an executive order for President Donald Trump to keep meat plants open during the pandemic. After receiving the draft, Trump issued an executive order which had similarities to the NAMI draft. The executive order was controversial, with labor unions criticizing it as putting the profits of the meat companies ahead of the safety of workers.

Organizational structure 
NAMI is governed by elected leaders and staffed by 35 professionals. NAMI elected leaders include five officers plus the president and CEO, as well as a 106-person board of directors and a 42-person executive committee.

The current officers are as follows:
 NAMI president and CEO: Julie Anna Potts
 Chairman: Warren Panico, Sigma
 Vice Chairman: Brad McDowell, Agri-Beef
 Treasurer: Steve Van Lannen, American Foods Group
 Secretary: Eric Gustafson, Coast Packing
 Immediate Past Chairman: Joe Mass, JTM Provisions

See also
Poultry farming in the United States
Canadian Meat Council
New Zealand Meat Producers Board
Meat Industry Association of New Zealand

References

External links
https://www.meatinstitute.org/

2015 establishments in the United States
Food industry trade groups
Lobbying organizations based in Washington, D.C.
Meat industry organizations